Cyrthydrolaelaps is a genus of mites in the family Veigaiidae.

Species
 Cyrthydrolaelaps hirtus Berlese, 1904

References

Mesostigmata